Te Hāpua is a community on the shores of the Parengarenga Harbour in Northland, New Zealand. The road to Te Hāpua leaves State Highway 1 at Waitiki Landing.

Te Hāpua is the most northerly settlement in the North Island of New Zealand. The 2013 Census recorded 84 people in the Te Hapua region.

Matiu Rata, Cabinet Minister in the Third Labour Government in the 1970s and founder of the Mana Motuhake party, was born in Te Hāpua in 1934.

The 1975 Māori land march left Te Hāpua for Wellington on 14 September 1975 (Maori Language Day).

Te Hāpua's Te Reo Mihi Marae is a traditional meeting ground for Ngāti Kurī, and includes Te Reo Mihi meeting house.

Demographics
The SA1 area is part of the larger North Cape statistical area.

The SA1 statistical area had a population of 141 at the 2018 New Zealand census, a decrease of 3 people (−2.1%) since the 2013 census, and a decrease of 24 people (−14.5%) since the 2006 census. There were 60 households, comprising 75 males and 66 females, giving a sex ratio of 1.14 males per female. The median age was 48.1 years (compared with 37.4 years nationally), with 24 people (17.0%) aged under 15 years, 30 (21.3%) aged 15 to 29, 69 (48.9%) aged 30 to 64, and 21 (14.9%) aged 65 or older.

Ethnicities were 14.9% European/Pākehā, 89.4% Māori, 6.4% Pacific peoples, and 2.1% Asian. People may identify with more than one ethnicity.

Of those people who chose to answer the census's question about religious affiliation, 12.8% had no religion, 14.9% were Christian and 63.8% had Māori religious beliefs.

Of those at least 15 years old, 3 (2.6%) people had a bachelor or higher degree, and 54 (46.2%) people had no formal qualifications. The median income was $16,200, compared with $31,800 nationally. The employment status of those at least 15 was that 36 (30.8%) people were employed full-time, 21 (17.9%) were part-time, and 12 (10.3%) were unemployed.

Education
It is New Zealand's northernmost school.

Climate
Te Hapua has a temperature oceanic climate (Cfb according to the Köppen climate classification), like much of New Zealand, with warm summers, mild winters and no dry season. Due to its maritime location, the ocean moderates temperatures year-round, and there is some seasonal lag.

Te Hapua receives  of precipitation each year. Although there is no dry season, winter is usually wetter than summer. The wettest month is July, which receives  of precipitation each year, while the driest month is January, which receives  of precipitation.

Notes

External links
Te Hāpua School website

Far North District
Populated places in the Northland Region